The Blind Woman of Sorrento (Italian:La cieca di Sorrento) is a 1916 Italian silent drama film directed by Gustavo Serena and starring Alfredo De Antoni, Olga Benetti and Carlo Benetti. It is set in the nineteenth century in Sorrento in southern Italy. It is an adaptation of the 1852 novel of the same title by Francesco Mastriani. Subsequent adaptations were made in 1934, 1952 and 1963.

Cast
Alfredo De Antoni 
 Carlo Benetti 
 Olga Benetti 
 Gustavo Serena
Domenico Cini 
 Bianca Cipriani 
 Lea Giunchi
 Giorgio Gizzi

References

Bibliography 
 Poppi, Roberto. I registi: dal 1930 ai giorni nostri.

External links 
 

1916 films
1910s historical drama films
Italian historical drama films
Italian silent feature films
1910s Italian-language films
Films directed by Gustavo Serena
Films based on Italian novels
Films set in Sorrento
Films set in the 19th century
Films about blind people
Italian black-and-white films
1916 drama films
Silent drama films